The works of J. R. R. Tolkien have generated a body of research covering many aspects of his fantasy writings. These encompass The Lord of the Rings and The Silmarillion, along with his legendarium that remained unpublished until after his death, and his constructed languages, especially the Elvish languages Quenya and Sindarin. Scholars from different disciplines have examined the linguistic and literary origins of Middle-earth, and have explored many aspects of his writings from Christianity to feminism and race.

Biographical 

Biographies of Tolkien have been written by Humphrey Carpenter, with his 1977 J. R. R. Tolkien: A Biography and of Tolkien's wartime years by John Garth with his 2003 Tolkien and the Great War: The Threshold of Middle-earth. Carpenter edited the 1981 The Letters of J. R. R. Tolkien, assisted by Christopher Tolkien. The brief period after the war when Tolkien worked for the OED is detailed in the 2006 book The Ring of Words: Tolkien and the Oxford English Dictionary by Peter Gilliver, Jeremy Marshall and Edmund Weiner.

On Tolkien's writings

Institutions 

A variety of institutions have developed to support Tolkien research. These include The Tolkien Society and The Mythopoeic Society. Tolkien archives are held in the Bodleian Library in Oxford and Marquette University in Milwaukee, Wisconsin.
Publishers of scholarly books on Tolkien include Houghton Mifflin, McFarland Press, Mythopoeic Press, Walking Tree Publishers, Palgrave MacMillan, and Kent State University Press.

Journals 

Early publications on Tolkien's writing were essentially fanzines; some, such as Mythlore, founded in 1969, developed into scholarly peer-reviewed (refereed) technical publications; among the "reputable" journals is Mallorn by the Tolkien Society. Other specialised journals include Tolkien Studies (2004–) and Journal of Tolkien Research (2014–). There are several journals that focus on the literary society The Inklings, of which Tolkien was a member, especially Journal of Inklings Studies (2011–).

Conferences

In 1992, the Mythopoeic Society held a conference for the centenary of Tolkien's birth, combining papers that were published in the conference proceedings, with a mixed programme of events over a period of eight days, 17–24 August 1992, in Oxford.

Omentielva is a European bi-yearly conference on research into Tolkien's invented languages.

Fields 

A large literature examines Tolkien's Middle-earth fantasy fiction from numerous points of view, including medievalism, its philological roots in languages such as Old Norse and Old English, its influences from literature of different periods, its poetry, its Christian symbolism, feminism, race, sexuality, and many other themes. These are overviewed in Blackwell's A Companion to J. R. R. Tolkien, which effectively marked his acceptance into the English literary canon.

Constructed languages 

Tolkien's constructed languages, Quenya and Sindarin, the main languages of Elves, have inspired linguistic research. Parma Eldalamberon and Vinyar Tengwar are published by the Elvish Linguistic Fellowship of the Mythopoeic Society a non-profit organization. The Vinyar Tengwar and Parma Eldalamberon material published at an increasing rate during the early 2000s is from the stock of linguistic material in the possession of the appointed team of editors (some 3000 pages according to them), consisting of photocopies sent them by Christopher Tolkien and notes taken in the Bodleian Library around 1992.  An Internet mailing list dedicated to Tolkien's languages, called tolklang, has existed since November 1, 1990.

Bibliography

Major introductory books

 
 
 
  
 
 
 
  (Revised and expanded 1992, 2005)

Journals

 Current
 Tolkien Studies (West Virginia University Press)
 Mythlore (Mythopoeic Society)
 Journal of Tolkien Research (Valparaiso University)
 Mallorn (The Tolkien Society)
 Vinyar Tengwar (Elvish Linguistic Fellowship)

 Transitory
 Fastitocalon: Studies in Fantasticism Ancient to Modern: Immortals and the Undead briefly existed in the 2010s.

References

External links

 The home page of the Elvish Linguistic Fellowship, which publishes the journals Parma Eldalamberon, Vinyar Tengwar, and Tengwestie, and sponsors the discussion list, Lambengolmor (discussion list launched 29 May 2002, archives at lambengolmor-l)
 Tolkien's Linguistic Writings and Drafts by Ryszard Derdzinski
 TolkienBooks.net Chronological Book Index - a comprehensive index of Tolkien Publications
  A List of Tolkien's Unpublished and Slightly Published Manuscripts by Lisa Star (concentrates on linguistic materials)
 Publications of the Tolkien Society (UK)
 Tolkien Studies at Signum University
 The Tolkien Professor website, offering free materials from Corey Olsen's courses at Signum University

 
Reception of J. R. R. Tolkien